Outline of Georgia may refer to:

 Outline of Georgia (country)
 Outline of Georgia (U.S. state)